Louis Ncamiso Ndlovu (March 15, 1945 – August 27, 2012) was the Roman Catholic bishop of the Roman Catholic Diocese of Manzini, Swaziland.

Ordained to the priesthood in 1975, Ndlovu was named a bishop in 1985; he died in office.

Notes

1945 births
2012 deaths
Swazi Roman Catholic bishops
Roman Catholic bishops of Manzini